Spion Kop Cemetery, originally known as Hartlepool Cemetery, is a disused cemetery on the coast near Hartlepool in England. It was opened in 1856 to replace St. Hilda's churchyard and designed by John Dobson. The area took its name from the Battle of Spion Kop in 1900 during the Boer War.

The cemetery was formed from a combination of sand dune and ship's ballast. It is closed to new burials and is now managed as a local nature reserve. Species found there include thrift, the pyramidal orchid, and the lesser meadow-rue.

References

External links 
 
 

Cemeteries in England
Hartlepool
1856 establishments in England
Nature reserves in County Durham